Helmut Rottensteiner (born 16 March 1977) is an Austrian football manager and former footballer who played as a midfielder.

External links
 

1977 births
Living people
Austrian footballers
Austrian Football Bundesliga players
SV Austria Salzburg players
FC Red Bull Salzburg players
FC Braunau players
SW Bregenz players
TSV Neumarkt players
Austrian football managers
SV Seekirchen players
Association football midfielders